Beth Huntington was a New Zealand netball player who represented her country on 13 occasions.

Netball career
Beth Mavis Huntingdon (née Carnie) was born on 15 July 1945. She made her debut for the Silver Ferns, the New Zealand national netball team, on 15 October 1974 against Singapore, en route to a tour of England, where New Zealand remained unbeaten. Playing as a goal shoot (GS), she was known for her idiosyncratic shooting style. In 1975 she was selected for the Silver Ferns team to take part in the world championships, which were held in Auckland, New Zealand, with New Zealand finishing in third place.

After retiring from playing Huntington continued her involvement with netball as a coach and was made a Life Member of Northern Suburbs Netball in Wellington.

References

1945 births
Living people
New Zealand international netball players
1975 World Netball Championships players